Flying Dust 105D is an Indian reserve of the Flying Dust First Nation in Saskatchewan.

References

Indian reserves in Saskatchewan
Division No. 17, Saskatchewan